Service Information was a regular slot in the early days of colour television in the United Kingdom that gave out engineering information for the radio and television trade. These announcements were made by the BBC continuity announcers of the time and were read over basic in-vision captions. The “programme” was broadcast on BBC2 during trade test transmissions and was not aimed at the general public or billed in the schedule. They went out three times a day 10.00a.m., 11.30a.m., and 2.30p.m. each weekday from 23 October 1967 to 1975, then once a day at 10.30a.m. from 1975 until the final broadcast on 23 December 1982. The IBA (and its predecessor, the ITA) had a similar programme called Engineering Announcements.

Format
In the days of early colour television in Great Britain the BBC2 daytime periods were filled with the colour test card and trade test colour films to help viewers and dealers to test and tune-in their television receivers.

Clock
Service Information bulletins would be preceded with a clock for two minutes and a catchy theme which was called Walk & Talk, played by the Syd Dale Orchestra, later replaced in 1978 with Swirly by Roger Limb.  The clock was electronically recoloured in a variety of colour schemes in order to differentiate it from the clock used for BBC2's main presentation.

Transmitters and relays
The bulletin would then start with information regarding current transmitters and relays being either on reduced power or off air. This would then be followed with news of brand new transmitters and relays and when they were due to come on air. Details of trade shows or exhibitions next and anything else related to the technical development of colour television at the time. Then there would be a recap of the day's transmitter news followed by a caption showing the address of the BBC Engineering Information Department. Because the bulletin was designed for the trade, not the general public, a degree of prior knowledge was often assumed in the script - notably it was assumed people know where the transmitters mentioned despite the fact that many of them had interesting or unusual names.

Trade test colour films
The bulletin would then end with a rundown of the trade test colour films being shown on that particular day. "And now we are returning to the colour test card and music until Play School at eleven o'clock" would be a familiar closing phrase.

Bulletin length
Service Information bulletins generally lasted an average of two or three minutes but on Wednesday 25 August 1971, the longest Service Information bulletin known was aired, which ran for 11 minutes.

Tuning information
A Monday to Friday Tuning Information bulletin was added to BBC2 in the heyday of colour coming to BBC1 and ITV from 10 November 1969 to 31 December 1970 at 6.15pm. with an extra transmission for a two-week period from 17 November 1969 until 28 November 1969 broadcast at 4.30pm (Mondays to Fridays).

Continuity announcers
The Service Information spots were often looked at by the BBC as a training ground for their new continuity announcers. Here they could deliver concise and informative speech for a few minutes at a time and broadcast relatively safely to a smaller than usual viewing audience.

Amongst the continuity announcers who could be heard during this period were:
 David Allan, Michael Birley, Peter Bolgar, John Braban, John Brand, Peter Brook, Andy Cartledge, Malcolm Eynon, Mike Gamble, John Glover, Martin King, John Leeson, Keith Martin, Roger Maude, Tim Nichols, Mel Oxley, Clive Roslin, John Ross-Barnard, Clem Shaw, Peter Shoesmith, Ian De Stains, Richard Straker, John Trevor, Colin Ward Lewis and Robin Whitting.

Example transcript
Here's a sample transcript of a 10 o'clock Service Information bulletin from Friday, 24 August 1973 which includes the announcement concerning the last day of trade test colour films being shown.

(note that in fact Coupe des Alpes – which had been revived as a finale having not been shown since 1968 – was not shown because cricket coverage began earlier than scheduled, and Guiseppina became the last trade test colour film ever shown.)

References

External links
 http://www.testcardcircle.org.uk/ttcf.html
 https://web.archive.org/web/20080613090728/http://www.transdiffusion.org/emc/halcyondays/1970s/hidden.php

BBC Television shows
British non-fiction television series
British television news shows
1967 British television series debuts
1982 British television series endings
Broadcasting in the United Kingdom
1970s British television series